Soft Living is a 1928 American silent comedy film directed by James Tinling and starring Madge Bellamy, Johnny Mack Brown and Mary Duncan.

Cast
 Madge Bellamy as Nancy Woods  
 Johnny Mack Brown as Stockney Webb
 Mary Duncan as Lorna Estabrook 
 Joyce Compton as Billie Wilson  
 Thomas Jefferson as Philip Estabrook  
 Henry Kolker as Roidney S. Bowen  
 Olive Tell as Mrs. Rodney S. Bowen  
 Bud Geary as Office Boy  
 Tom Dugan as Hired Man  
 Dave Wengren as Swede

References

Bibliography
 Solomon, Aubrey. The Fox Film Corporation, 1915-1935: A History and Filmography. McFarland, 2011.

External links

1928 films
1928 comedy films
Silent American comedy films
Films directed by James Tinling
American silent feature films
1920s English-language films
Fox Film films
1920s American films